Professor Peter K Smith (born 23 September 1943) is Emeritus Professor of Psychology at Goldsmiths College, University of London.  His research interest is children’s social development. Smith was Head of the Unit for School and Family Studies in the Department of Psychology at  Goldsmiths from 1998 to 2011. He received his B.Sc at the University of Oxford and his Ph.D. from the University of Sheffield; following his doctorate he continued at the University of Sheffield, obtaining a Personal Chair in 1991, before moving to Goldsmiths College in 1995. He is a Fellow of the British Psychological Society, the Association of Psychological Sciences, and the Academy of Social Sciences.

Academic work
Smith has authored, co-authored or co-edited 28 books, and authored or co-authored 198 journal articles and 124 book chapters.

His general works in children’s development include the book Adolescence: A Very Short Introduction (Oxford University Press, 2016) [2] and successive editions of the textbook (with Helen Cowie and Mark Blades) Understanding Children’s Development (Blackwells, 1988, 1991, 1998, 2002, 2011, 2015). He co-edited collection (with Craig Hart) the Wiley-Blackwell Handbook of Childhood Social Development (Wiley-Blackwell, 2010). In 2015 he was awarded the William Thierry Preyer award for Excellence in Research on Human Development, by the European Society for Developmental Psychology.

He is known for his work on children’s play, and works include the edited collection (with Tony Pellegrini) The nature of play: Great apes and humans (Guilford, 2005), and the book Children and Play (Blackwell, 2010)

His most extensive research has been on bullying and violence in schools, where he has led a number of research projects. He was the Chair of the European Cooperation in Science and Technology Cyberbullying Action (COST ACTION IS0801) from 2008 to 2012, and was PI of a project Bullying, Cyberbullying, and Pupil Safety and Wellbeing, financed by the Indian-European Research Networking in the Social sciences initiative (2012-2015). He is currently co-PI of a project Comparative study of cyberbullying in Qatar and the UK: risk factors, impact on health and solutions, financed by the Qatar National Research Fund (2013-2016).  Publications include the edited collections (with Debra Pepler and Ken Rigby) Bullying in Schools: How Successful can Interventions be? (Cambridge University Press, 2004); (with Qing Li and Donna Cross) Cyberbullying in the Global Playground: Research from International Perspectives (Wiley-Blackwell, 2012); (with Georges Steffgen) Cyberbullying through the new media: Findings from an international network (Psychology Press, 2013) and (with Keumjoo Kwak and Yuichi Toda) School bullying in different cultures: Eastern and western perspectives (Cambridge University Press, 2016). He is author of Understanding school bullying: Its nature and prevention strategies (Sage, 2014).

References

External links
Official staff page at Goldsmiths College

1943 births
20th-century psychologists
21st-century British psychologists
Living people
British psychologists
Academics of Goldsmiths, University of London
Alumni of the University of Oxford
Alumni of the University of Sheffield
Fellows of the British Psychological Society